Dinan Bashnoian Wala is a city in Bahawalnagar district in Punjab, Pakistan.

Populated places in Bahawalnagar District